"Teddy Boy" is a song by Paul McCartney included  on his first solo album McCartney, released in April 1970. According to Ernie Santosuosso of The Boston Globe, it describes the way in which a close relationship between a widow and her grown son is destroyed by her new romantic interest.

Background
Paul McCartney wrote "Teddy Boy" during the Beatles' 1968 visit to India. In 1970, McCartney described the song as, "Another song I started in India and completed in Scotland, and London gradually. This one was recorded for the Get Back film, but later not used."

Recording

January 1969
McCartney first played the song to the other Beatles on 9 January 1969. The Beatles did not return to the song until 24 January, recording several takes. This recording includes some instances of guitar feedback. During one rendition of the song, John Lennon is heard calling "do-si-do" and other square-dance steps, something both musicologist Walter Everett and Beatles historian Mark Lewisohn ascribe to Lennon's boredom with the song. Musicologist and writer Ian MacDonald writes that any attempts at recording the song "were sabotaged by Lennon's continuous burble of parody". MacDonald describes "Teddy Boy" as an "annoyingly whimsical ditty – notable solely for its key change from D major to F sharp major".

The Beatles recorded "Teddy Boy" again on 28 and 29 January.

December 1969 – February 1970
McCartney recorded the McCartney version of "Teddy Boy" at his home in Cavendish Avenue, St John's Wood. He began the album around Christmas 1969, recording on a recently delivered Studer four-track tape recorder, without a mixing desk, and therefore with no VU displays as a guide for recording levels. McCartney described his home-recording set-up as "Studer, one mike, and nerve". He had finished recording the basic track of "Teddy Boy" by 12 February 1970, when he brought his tapes to Morgan Studios. These tapes were transferred from four- to eight-track tape, adding an audible hiss to the recording. At Morgan Studios, McCartney completed the track by overdubbing drums, a bass drum and clapping.

Release and reception

The Beatles
The Beatles asked engineer Glyn Johns to mix an LP from their January 1969 recordings. Johns selected take two of "Teddy Boy" from 24 January for his first mix of Get Back. Authors Doug Sulpy and Ray Schweighardt view this selection as "poor judgement" on the engineer's part. Johns mixed the track for stereo on 10 March 1969 at Olympic Sound Studios. Bootleg copies of the mix circulated under titles such as Hot as Sun and Kum Back. In October 1969, Ernie Santosuosso obtained a version of Johns' Get Back and reviewed it for The Boston Globe, writing of "Teddy Boy" that "'Mama, Don’t Worry, Your Teddy Boy’s Here' offers a persistent repetition of theme larded with square dance calls and deft guitar chord changes." As there was no footage of the Beatles playing "Teddy Boy" in the Let It Be film, Johns removed it from his second version of Get Back, replacing it with "Across the Universe" and "I Me Mine". Lewisohn writes that it is also possible that on 4 January 1970 McCartney told Johns that he was about to re-record the song for his solo album.

Due to the Beatles' dissatisfaction with Johns' two attempts, Lennon passed the Get Back tapes on to Phil Spector. Although Johns omitted "Teddy Boy" from the LP, Spector, assisted by engineers Peter Brown and Roger Ferris, made two mixes of the song on 25 March 1970. He kept one at its full length and edited another down from 7:30 to 3:10. This mix, which Sulpy and Schweighardt describe as a "butchered version", has never been officially released. A later mix included on the 1996 compilation album Anthology 3 comprises three portions of the 28 January take joined to two segments of the 24 January take.

McCartney
In his album review for the Chicago Tribune, Robb Baker wrote that "'Teddy Boy' exists only as a bad example of the story song genre that McCartney usually does so well." Jared Johnson of The Morning Call said that the Beatles' version as heard on bootlegs had "substance, force and conviction", while "The finished product, though more refined, is shallow and superficial, threatened with fading away into nothingness." According to Santosuosso, the song "tells of filial alienation from a widowed mother who falls in love again. The recurring refrain is the guts of this song."

Personnel

McCartney

Personnel per Howard Sounes:
Paul McCartney lead vocals, guitar, bass, drums
Linda McCartney backing vocals

Anthology 3

Personnel per Ian MacDonald:
Paul McCartney vocal, acoustic guitar
John Lennon vocal
George Harrison lead guitar
Ringo Starr drums

References

Footnotes

Citations

Sources

 
 
 
 
 
 
 
 
 
 
 
 
 
 

The Beatles songs
1970 songs
Songs written by Paul McCartney
Paul McCartney songs
Song recordings produced by Paul McCartney
Music published by MPL Music Publishing